Mizuho Kataoka (片岡瑞帆, born 11 October 1994 ) is a Japanese women's rugby union player. In 2017, she competed with the Japan women's national rugby union team, for the 2017 Women's Rugby World Cup .

Career 
She started playing rugby in high school. After graduating from Shiba Commercial High School in 2013, she entered Nippon Sport Science University. In 2015, she was appointed captain of the women's  team at Nippon Sport Science University.

She competed at the 2014 Asia Rugby Women's Championship, 2016 Asia Rugby Women's Championship, and 2017 Asia Rugby Women's Championship.

References 

1994 births
Japanese rugby union players
Living people